The 2015 Qatar Total Open was a professional women's tennis tournament played on hard courts. It was the 13th edition of the event and part of the WTA Premier series of the 2015 WTA Tour. It took place at the International Tennis and Squash Complex in Doha, Qatar from 23 February to 28 February.

Points and prize money

Point distribution

Prize money

*per team

Singles main-draw entrants

Seeds

1 Rankings as of February 16, 2015.

Other entrants
The following players received wildcards into the singles main draw:
  Victoria Azarenka
  Ons Jabeur
  Caroline Wozniacki

The following players received entry from the qualifying draw:
  Alexandra Dulgheru
  Kirsten Flipkens
  Daria Gavrilova
  Stefanie Vögele

The following player received entry as a lucky loser:
  Zheng Saisai

Withdrawals
Before the tournament
  Dominika Cibulková → replaced by  Sabine Lisicki
  Simona Halep (right rib injury) → replaced by  Zheng Saisai
  Peng Shuai → replaced by  Casey Dellacqua

Retirements
  Alexandra Dulgheru (upper respiratory tract infection)
  Jelena Janković (right hip injury)
  Garbiñe Muguruza (viral illness)

Doubles main-draw entrants

Seeds

1 Rankings as of February 16, 2015.

Other entrants
The following pairs received wildcards into the doubles main draw:
  Fatma Al-Nabhani /  Zheng Saisai
  Victoria Azarenka /  Kirsten Flipkens
The following pairs received entry as alternates:
  Yuliya Beygelzimer /  Olga Savchuk
  Jarmila Gajdošová /  Andrea Petkovic
  Darija Jurak /  Klára Koukalová

Withdrawals
Before the tournament
  Kristina Mladenovic (viral infection)
  Garbiñe Muguruza (viral illness)
  Karolína Plíšková (viral illness)
During the tournament
  Kirsten Flipkens (viral illness)

Champions

Singles

  Lucie Šafářová def.  Victoria Azarenka, 6–4, 6–3

Doubles

  Raquel Kops-Jones /  Abigail Spears def.  Hsieh Su-wei /  Sania Mirza, 6–4, 6–4

External links
Official Website

Qatar Total Open
Qatar Ladies Open
2015 in Qatari sport